"Paradise" is a song by American hip hop recording artist Big Sean, released on September 19, 2014 as the second single from his third studio album Dark Sky Paradise (2015). Originally the song was released as a single in October 2014 but was later placed on the album as an extended version with an extra verse.

Background and release
On September 12, 2014, Big Sean announced he had signed with Roc Nation for a management deal, but he is still with GOOD Music. On the same day, he has released 4 new songs, "I Don't Fuck with You", "Paradise", "4th Quarter" and "Jit / Juke". The production for these songs were included Mike Will Made It, DJ Mustard, Kanye West, DJ Dahi, Nate Fox, Da Internz, L&F and Key Wane. The single version was released on iTunes October 7, 2014.

Music video
A music video for the song was released on October 9, 2014 via Sean's Vevo channel. It was directed by Mike Carson.

Charts

Certifications

References

2014 singles
2014 songs
Big Sean songs
Def Jam Recordings singles
GOOD Music singles
Song recordings produced by Mike Will Made It
Songs written by Big Sean
Songs written by Mike Will Made It